Apertifusus caparti is a species of sea snail, a marine gastropod mollusc in the family Fasciolariidae, the spindle snails, the tulip snails and their allies.

Description

Distribution

References

 Vermeij G.J. & Snyder M.A. (2018). Proposed genus-level classification of large species of Fusininae (Gastropoda, Fasciolariidae). Basteria. 82(4-6): 57-82

External links
 Adam W. & Knudsen J. (1955). Note sur quelques espèces de mollusques marins nouveaux ou peu connus de l'Afrique occidentale. Bulletin de l'Institut Royal des Sciences Naturelles de Belgique. 31(61): 1-25

caparti
Gastropods described in 1950